Taoulga islands is a protected area of Libya.

References

Protected areas of Libya
Islands of Libya